The Afāq Khoja Mausoleum or Aba Khoja Mausoleum (آفاق خواجه مزار) (Uyghur: Apaq Xoja Maziri), is a mausoleum in Xinjiang, China. The holiest local Muslim site, it is located some 5 km north-east from the centre of Kashgar, in Haohan Village ( Hào Hǎn Cūn; Ayziret in Uyghur), which has is also known as Yaghdu. The shrine is heavily patronized by sightseers and has been designated as a tourist attraction by Chinese officials.

History
The mazar (mausoleum) was initially built in ca. 1640 as the tomb of Muhammad Yūsuf, a Central Asian Naqshbandi Sufi master who had come to the Altishahr region (present-day Southern Xinjiang) in the early 17th century and possibly was also active in spreading Sufism in China proper.<ref>Due to scanty and imprecise documentary evidence, the late career of Muhammad Yūsuf and the date of his death remain uncertain. According to Joseph Fletcher's research, Muhammad Yūsuf had worked among  Hui and Salar people in present-day Gansu and Qinghai provinces in the mid-17th century, then returned to Altishahr and died there in 1653, poisoned by his rivals. On the other hand, the dean of Hui studies in China, Ma Tong, thought that Muhammad Yūsuf died in 1622, and all preaching in Qinghai and Gansu was done by his son Afāq Khoja. ( Lipman's source is: Joseph Fletcher, "The Naqshbandiya in Northwest China", in {{cite book|title=Studies on Chinese and Islamic Inner Asia|editor=Beatrcie Manz| place=London|publisher=Variorum|year=1995}})</ref> Later, Muhammad Yūsuf's more famous son and successor, Afāq Khoja, was buried there as well in 1694. As believed, the tiled mausoleum contains the tombs of five generations of the Afāqi family, providing resting places for 72 of its members.

Description
The mausoleum is perhaps the finest example of Islamic architecture in Xinjiang. A large dome of 17 m is at the center surrounded by four corner minarets with stripes and arabesque floral patterns. Each of the windows of the minarets are in a different geometric pattern while the tops have turrets with an inverted lotus dome and scalloped edges. The entrance to the mausoleum is a majestic facade and a tiled iwan-niche style typical of Central Asian mosques.

The tombs are decorated with blue glazed tiles and draped in colorful silks. Inside the tomb hall is the Casket of Iparhan which supposedly carried her from Beijing.

There is a mausoleum, four prayer halls which are supported by wooden beams with muqarnas on the capitals, a lecture hall and a cemetery which is still in use by the Ugyhur population and has distinctive mud and brick tombs. A gateway also has blue glazed tiles and there is a pond in the courtyard for people to cleanse before entering."This was the famous shrine, and we were invited to step inside, where we saw a crowded mass of bluetiled tombs, that of the Saint-King being draped with red and white cloths. There were numbers of flags and banners before the tombs, and on one side was a palanquin in which a great-grandson of Apak had travelled to and from Peking. While there he had married his daughter to a Chinaman, and at the date of our visit a Celestial had arrived in Kashgar accompanied by a band of relatives, to demand his share of the great wealth of the shrine. His credentials were unexceptionable, and during a century and a half his ancestors had been given pensions by the Chinese Government; but owing to the revolution these subsidies had been stopped. Hence his appearance, which was causing much perturbation among the managers of the shrine funds."'' - Sir Percy Sykes and Ella Sykes. Sykes, Ella and Percy Sykes. pages 69-70 Through deserts and oases of Central Asia. London. Macmillan and Co. Limited, 1920.

Gallery

Chinese tourism
Chinese officials have been associating the site with the Fragrant Concubine, or Xiang Fei, a Kashgar woman in Chinese legend who was taken as a consort by the 18th-century Qianlong Emperor. Early accounts call Xiang Fei, known as Iparhan in Uyghur, the wife (or daughter) of a descendant of Afaq Khoja, and a sign has marked her supposed tomb at the Afaq Khoja shrine. She was the wife of a rogue leader who was captured by Qianlong's troops and was taken to Beijing to be the emperor's imperial concubine. Refusing to serve him, a Uyghur tale said she was forced to commit suicide or was murdered by the Emperor's mother.

In 2015, officials opened a tourist park named Xiang Fei Garden near the mausoleum. Pilgrimage near or at the holy site has been discouraged or banned by the officials. The shrine is heavily patronized by sightseers, especially China's ethnic-Han majority, and has been designated as a tourist attraction by Chinese officials.

References

Kashgar
Mausoleums in China
Dargahs
Major National Historical and Cultural Sites in Xinjiang